The Ninoy Aquino Stadium, now known as PSC Multipurpose Gym, is an indoor sporting arena located in the Rizal Memorial Sports Complex in Manila, Philippines. Originally built in the 1950s, it was renovated and renamed for Philippine senator Benigno S. Aquino Jr. in 1989.



History

Ninoy Aquino Stadium was originally built in the 1950s as an open-air stadium, in time for the 1954 Asian Games. By the 1980s, it had been converted into an indoor arena named Rizal Multi-Purpose Arena, in time for the 1989 ABC Under-18 Championships, which opened on January 24, 1989. At the opening of the tournament, it was renamed Ninoy Aquino Stadium and a marker dedicating the arena was unveiled. The renovation included new chairs and a new scoring system from South Korea installed by Korean technicians. It also hosted the volleyball tournament of the 1991 Southeast Asian Games, the table tennis competitions of the 2005 Southeast Asian Games and the 2013 FIBA Asia Championship as the second venue of the tournament.

It has also hosted college basketball games (UAAP, NCAA, NCRAA and the NAASCU), taekwondo tournaments, the two editions of the BSCP National Pool Championships and was an alternate venue of PBA games. It was also the home court of the Manila Metrostars in the now-defunct Metropolitan Basketball Association.

The Ninoy Aquino Stadium was renovated for the 2019 Southeast Asian Games to host the taekwondo and weightlifting competitions. New seats and a new air-conditioning system were installed in the arena with the plans for the facility to become "high-tech" or up to par with modern standards. Both the NCAA and the UAAP expressed interest to hold their games in the arena again. The renovation of the facility was completed on November 13, 2019 with the send-off ceremony for the Philippine team in preparation for the games held at the arena.

The facility was temporarily used as an refurbished as a quarantine and isolation center in April 2020 during the COVID-19 pandemic.

In August 2021, the arena was renamed PSC Multipurpose Gym.

Notable events at the Ninoy Aquino Stadium
 Asian Games (1954)
 1989 ABC Under-18 Championship
 Southeast Asian Games (1991, 2005, 2019)
 Hillsong United Live In Manila (2008)
 Pinoy Big Brother: Double Up The Big Night
 2009 Asian Men's Volleyball Championship
 2010 MVP Invitational Champions' Cup
 2013 FIBA Asia Championship

References

Sports venues in Manila
Indoor arenas in the Philippines
Basketball venues in the Philippines
Buildings and structures in Malate, Manila
Volleyball venues in the Philippines
Judo venues
Badminton in the Philippines
Badminton venues
Quarantine facilities designated for the COVID-19 pandemic